Marianne Berndt (born December 24, 1978) is a female shot putter and discus thrower from Chile. She set her personal best (16.39m) in the women's shot put at the 2003 South American Championships.

Competition record

References

1978 births
Living people
Chilean female discus throwers
Chilean female shot putters
Athletes (track and field) at the 1999 Pan American Games
Athletes (track and field) at the 2003 Pan American Games
Chilean people of German descent
Pan American Games competitors for Chile
21st-century Chilean women